The 1931–32 Western Kentucky State Teachers  men's basketball team represented Western Kentucky State Normal School and Teachers College (now known as Western Kentucky University) during the 1931-32 NCAA basketball season. The team was led by future Naismith Memorial Basketball Hall of Fame coach Edgar Diddle and team captain Orlie Lawrence.  The Hilltoppers won the Kentucky Intercollegiate Athletic Conference, the school's first conference championship.  Thomas Hobbs and James O. Lawrence were named to the All-State team.

Schedule

|-
!colspan=6| 1932 Kentucky Intercollegiate Athletic Conference Tournament

|-
!colspan=6| 1932 Southern Intercollegiate Athletic Association Tournament

References

Western Kentucky Hilltoppers basketball seasons
Western Kentucky State Teachers
Western Kentucky State Teachers
Western Kentucky State Teachers